William Patrick Lawlor (September 17, 1854 –  July 24, 1926) was an associate justice of the California Supreme Court from January 3, 1915, to July 25, 1926.

Biography

Lawlor was born in Manhattan, New York City, New York, on September 17, 1854, the son of Irish immigrants, Patrick Lawlor and Eliza Maher. Orphaned by the time he was 10 years of age, he received three years of public education in New York before coming to live with his uncle in Paterson, New Jersey, after his parents' death. In Paterson, he worked days as a bobbin boy in the textile factories, and attended night classes. In 1877, Lawlor moved to California and worked in the silver mines in Napa. In 1885, he moved to San Francisco and became involved in Democratic party politics.

He was a member of the Bohemian Club and The Family club, as well  as one of the five co-founders of The Commonwealth Club. He lived at 545 Powell Street, San Francisco.

Legal career
Beginning at age 30, Lawlor studied law at University of California, Hastings College of Law, 1885-1887, and in the offices of Rhodes & Barstow and Dennis Spencer in San Francisco, California. (Augustus L. Rhodes was chief justice of California from 1870 to 1872.) On December 16, 1898, Governor James Budd named Lawlor, then age 40, a judge of the San Francisco County Superior Court. He was re-elected to the bench in 1900, 1906 and 1912. As a Superior Court judge, Lawlor dismissed indictments in the San Francisco trolley bribery cases against Patrick Calhoun, Tirey L. Ford, Thornwell Mullally, and William M. Abbott, officials of the United Railroads.

In 1910, Lawlor ran unsuccessfully against Republican candidate Henry A. Melvin for the California Supreme Court. In 1914, Lawlor was elected an associate justice of the California Supreme Court, replacing Frank M. Angellotti who was elected chief justice. Lawlor served in that position from January 3, 1915, until his death on July 25, 1926. In 1922, Lawlor ran against Curtis D. Wilbur for the position of chief justice, but lost.

Personal life
On November 25, 1913, Lawlor married Mary Lee Henry. The couple had no children.

References

External links
 
 
 Past & Present Justices. California State Courts. Retrieved July 19, 2017.

Selected publications

See also
 List of justices of the Supreme Court of California

1854 births
1926 deaths
Justices of the Supreme Court of California
U.S. state supreme court judges admitted to the practice of law by reading law
20th-century American judges
Superior court judges in the United States
20th-century American lawyers
Lawyers from San Francisco
19th-century American lawyers